The following is a timeline of time capsules that are either scheduled to be installed, to be opened or have already been opened.

Timeline of installations

References

External links 

 Ten most-wanted time capsules, Ogelthorpe University

Time capsules